Eutropis tammanna (Tammanna skink) is a species of skink endemic to the island of Sri Lanka.

Habitat and distribution
It is a terrestrial skink from the arid north-western region of the island.

Description
The snout is short. It lacks transparent disks on the lower eyelids. Post-nasala are absent. There are 15 lamellae under the fourth toe. Dorsal scales have 4–5 keels. The dorsum is medium brown, and the lips are bright orange in males and yellow in females, the color extending to the middle of the flanks. A black stripe extends from below the eye to beyond the base of tail, with large creamy yellow spots; in females, this stripe is paler. The venter is yellowish cream.

Ecology and diet
It is found under heaps of debris such as coconut husk piles close to sea beaches.

References

External links
 Photo of Tammanna skink
 Mapress.com
 A new skink found from Sri Lanka

Eutropis
Reptiles described in 2008
Reptiles of Sri Lanka
Taxa named by Indraneil Das
Taxa named by Anslem de Silva
Taxa named by Christopher C. Austin